Salivary acidic proline-rich phosphoprotein 1/2 is a protein that in humans is encoded by the PRH1 gene.

References

Further reading

Salivary proline-rich proteins